Euclides Da Silva Cabral (born 5 January 1999) is a Portuguese footballer who plays as a full-back.

Club career
On 20 January 2021, he signed a 1.5-year contract with St. Gallen.

Personal life
Cabral was born in Portugal and is of Cape Verdean descent. He is the cousin of the footballer Gelson Martins.

Career statistics

Club

Notes

References

1999 births
Living people
Portuguese people of Cape Verdean descent
Footballers from Lisbon
Portuguese footballers
Association football forwards
FC Sion players
Sporting CP footballers
Grasshopper Club Zürich players
FC St. Gallen players
Apollon Limassol FC players
Swiss Super League players
Swiss Challenge League players
Cypriot First Division players
Portuguese expatriate footballers
Portuguese expatriate sportspeople in Switzerland
Portuguese expatriate sportspeople in Cyprus
Expatriate footballers in Switzerland
Expatriate footballers in Cyprus